WDSE may refer to:

 WDSE (TV), a PBS member station in Duluth, Minnesota, United States
 WDSE-FM, an adult album alternative radio station in Duluth, Minnesota, United States